Ali Abdullah Hafeedh (born 21 February 1997) is a Yemeni footballer who plays as a forward. His club is Al-Wehda Aden.

International career 
Hafeedh was part of the Yemeni squad at the 2019 AFC Asian Cup in the United Arab Emirates.

References

External links

Living people
Yemeni footballers
Yemen international footballers
1997 births
Al-Wehda SC (Aden) players
Association football forwards
Yemeni League players
2019 AFC Asian Cup players